Hermel (also spelled Harmil) is a Syrian village located in the Ayn Halaqim Subdistrict of the Masyaf District in Hama Governorate. According to the Syria Central Bureau of Statistics (CBS), Hermel had a population of 871 in the 2004 census. Its inhabitants are predominantly Turkmens.

References 

Populated places in Masyaf District
Turkmen communities in Syria